Mount McNicoll is a mountain in the northern Selkirks in Glacier National Park, in the Canadian province of British Columbia, located southeast of Mount Pearce.  It is the fifth-highest peak in its range.  It is on the Columbia River drainage.  Mount McNicoll is named for David McNicoll (1852–1916), the general manager, director, and vice-president of the Canadian Pacific Railway.

Routes
Unknown.

References

External links
 Mount McNicoll at bivouac.com

Selkirk Mountains
Two-thousanders of British Columbia
Glacier National Park (Canada)
Kootenay Land District